Plain and Simple is a studio album by The Dubliners, the last to be produced by Phil Coulter. Released on the Polydor label in 1973, it featured a number of tracks penned by Coulter himself, including "The Town I Loved So Well", written about The Troubles in his hometown of Derry, and "The Ballad of Ronnie's Mare", a satirical song inspired by Ronnie Drew's equestrian interests. It was the last studio album to feature all five original members of the group.

Track listing

Side One
 "Donegal Danny"
 "Queen of the Fair/The Tongs by the Fire"
 "Fiddler's Green"
 "Johnston's Motor Car"
 "The Wonder Hornpipe"
 "The Jail of Cluian Meala"

Side Two
 "The Town I Loved So Well"
 "The Ballad of Ronnie's Mare"
 "The Three Sea Captains"
 "Skibbereen"
 "Rebellion - Wrap the Green Flag 'Round Me Boys/The West's Awake/A Nation Once Again"

Personnel
 Ronnie Drew
 Luke Kelly
 Barney McKenna
 Ciarán Bourke
 John Sheahan

The Dubliners albums
1973 albums
Albums produced by Phil Coulter
Polydor Records albums